ADNOC Gas Processing (formerly known as GASCO) is a natural gas producing company and the largest gas processing complex in Abu Dhabi, UAE.

History
ADNOC Gas Processing is based Abu Dhabi, UAE. It manages over 3,000 km of pipeline network and 26 processing trains. In 2000 ADNOC Gas Processing started a $1.5 billion tender for its gas terminals expansion. ADNOC launched a Downstream Investment Forum in 2018, which attracted more foreign investments for the Ruwais Refinery. For the last 40 years, the ADNOC has been refining Murban grade crude, which is extracted from its onshore fields in the Emirate of Abu Dhabi. The "Crude Flexibility Project" (CFP) has made significant progress in 2020, with the ADNOC having a 73% project delivery which is constantly increasing from the refining capabilities in Ruwais. The CFP is to be completed in mid-2022, allowing the ADNOC to process up to 420,000 bpsd (Barrels per Stream Day) of the heavier grades of crude oil at the Ruwais refinery, which processes in total 840,000 bpsd. The necessary physical infrastructure required for the CFP has been put into place, only the structural elements such as 2 new fractionators and 24 atmospheric residue desulfurizer reactors were installed in the months of June and July 2020.

The Abu Dhabi National Oil Company (ADNOC) signed two EPC contracts in 2020, one with Petrofac Emirates LLC, a subsidiary of Petrofac Ltd., and the other a joint venture with Petrofac and Sapura Energy Bhd. for the development of ADNOC's Dalma gas development project. Together, the contracts are valued to be worth over $1.65 billion, and they are scheduled to be completed by 2022.

Shareholders
ADNOC Gas Processing is a subsidiary of the Abu Dhabi National Oil Company (ADNOC), which owns 68 percent stake in the company. Other shareholders are Shell Abu Dhabi (15 percent), Total SA (15 percent) and Partex (2 percent).  The company was established in 1975.

Overview of personnel
The company's current CEO is Sultan Ahmed Al Jaber.
 Shayma Al Mazrouei, Environment Department Team Leader in ADNOC Gas Processing's Environment, health and safety (HSE), Division, received the Sustainability Manager of the Year Award 2020 for her continuous contribution to environmental conservations through an innovative water reduction program.

References

External links

Oil and gas companies of the United Arab Emirates
Manufacturing companies based in Abu Dhabi
Energy companies established in 1975
Emirati companies established in 1975